is a 2019 Japanese horror film directed by Lisa Takeba. Based on the manga of the same name written by Arata Miyatsuki and illustrated by Shigure Kondo, the film stars Kanna Hashimoto and Yuta Koseki.

Signal 100 premiered at the Sitges Film Festival in October 2019. It received a theatrical release in Japan on 24 January 2020.

Cast
 Kanna Hashimoto as Rena Kashimura
 Yuta Koseki as Sota Sakaki
 Toshiki Seto as Hayato Wada
 Shouma Kai as Seiya Saionji
 Masaki Nakao as Subaru Fujiharu
 Shodai Fukuyama as Gen Kirino
 Keisuke Nakata as Kenta Hashiba

Release
Signal 100 had its world premiere at the Sitges Film Festival in Sitges, Spain, in October 2019. It was released in Japan across theatres nationwide on 24 January 2020.

On 24 January 2023, the film was made available in the United States on the streaming service Screambox.

References

External links
 

2010s Japanese-language films
2019 horror films
2019 horror thriller films
2020s Japanese-language films
2020 horror films
2020 horror thriller films
Japanese horror thriller films
Japanese splatter films
Live-action films based on manga